Mary Eugenia Wharton (October 12, 1912 – November 28, 1991) was an American botanist, author, and environmental activist.

Biography
Wharton was born in Jessamine County, Kentucky on October 12, 1912, the younger of two daughters of Joseph Felix and Mayme (née Davis) Wharton. In 1916, the family moved to Lexington. Wharton graduated from the University of Kentucky in 1935 with a bachelor's degree in botany and geology. She then received both a master's degree in 1936 and a doctorate from the University of Michigan in 1946. In 1942, she collected dewberry, a berry closely related to blackberries, from Montgomery County, Kentucky. This berry proved to be a new species and was named Rubus whartoniae in her honor.

After her doctoral work, she spent 30 years teaching at Georgetown College and later became head of the Biology Department. In fact, Georgetown College later dedicated a wing of the George Matt Asher Science Center to her. She collected plant species for the University of Kentucky Herbarium. Wharton also served as the Kentucky Academy of Science representative on the Council of the American Association for the Advancement of Science.

Besides being an avid plant collector, Wharton was also a writer. Wharton collaborated with Roger Barbour on two field guides,  Wildflowers and Ferns of Kentucky (1971) and Shrubs of Kentucky (1973), and a natural history of the Inner Blueglass Region, Bluegrass Land and Life. In addition, Wharton edited diaries and letters of Martha McDowell Buford Jones, a Confederate wife, published in 1986 as Horse World of the Bluegrass and Peach Leather and Rebel Grey.

Beginning in the late 1950s, Wharton bought parcels of land on the Kentucky River and founded the Floracliff Nature Sanctuary in 1989; it was dedicated as a Kentucky State Nature Preserve on March 15, 1996. Wharton protected part of the sanctuary using a scenic easement. In fact, she was the first to use a scenic easement in Kentucky. Wharton  also cofounded the Land and Nature Trust of Bluegrass to help preserve many parts of the bluegrass region such as Raven Run, greenway parks, and the Paris-Lexington corridor. She held the positions of chairman or President of the Board for this organization several times. She was also a member of The Kentucky Nature Conservatory Board and the Kentucky River Steering Committee.

Wharton was involved in environmental activism throughout her later years in particular issues such as the proposed damming of the Red River Gorge and the expansion of the Paris Pike. She was also a member of the Colonial Dames, Daughters of the American Revolution, and the United Daughters of the Confederacy.

Wharton died on November 28, 1991, in Lexington, Kentucky.

Partial bibliography

 
 

Wharton, M.E. (1945) Floristics and vegetation of the Devonian-Mississippian black shale region of Kentucky. Ph.D. dissertation, University of Michigan, Ann Arbor.

References

External links
Guide to the Mary E. Wharton papers, 1856–1993 housed at the University of Kentucky Libraries Special Collections Research Center
Mary Wharton (Album), Floracliff Nature Sanctuary Flickr Collection
Mary Wharton's Floracliff Nature Sanctuary

1912 births
1991 deaths
American women botanists
Georgetown College (Kentucky) faculty
University of Kentucky alumni
University of Michigan alumni
People from Jessamine County, Kentucky
20th-century American botanists
20th-century American women scientists
Kentucky women botanists
American women academics